This is the list of episodes from Billy the Exterminator.

Series overview 
{| class="wikitable plainrowheaders" style="text-align: center;"
|-
! style="padding: 0px 8px;" colspan="2" rowspan="2"| Season
! style="padding: 0px 8px;" rowspan="2"| Episodes
! colspan="3" style="padding: 0px 8px;"| Originally Aired
! style="padding: 0px 8px;"| DVD release dates
|-
! scope="col" style="padding: 0px 8px;"| Season premiere
! scope="col" style="padding: 0px 8px;"| Season finale
! scope="col" style="padding: 0px 8px;"| Network
! scope="col" style="padding: 0px 8px;"| Region 1
|-
 |style="background-color: #B10712;"|
 ! scope="row" style="text-align:center;"|1
 |13
 |
 |
 |rowspan="6"|A&E
 |
|-
 |style="background-color: #8D3A63;"|
 ! scope="row" style="text-align:center;"|2
 |20
 |
 |
 |
|-
 |style="background-color: #61b329;"|
 ! scope="row" style="text-align:center;"|3
 |16
 |
 |
 |
|-
 |style="background-color: #1C5A5A;"|
 ! scope="row" style="text-align:center;"|4
 |12
 |
 |
 |
|-
 |style="background-color: #5A4A76;"|
 ! scope="row" style="text-align:center;"|5
 |11
 |
 |
 |
|-
 |style="background-color: #8A4500;"|
 ! scope="row" style="text-align:center;"|6
 |16
 |
 |
 |
|-
 |style="background-color: #8A4500;"|
 ! scope="row" style="text-align:center;"|7
 |12
 |
 ||
 |rowspan="1"|CMT Canada
 |
|}

Episodes

Season 1 (2009)

Season 2 (2010)

Season 3 (2010)

Season 4 (2011)

Season 5 (2012)

Season 6 (2012)

Season 7 (2016)

References

Lists of reality television series episodes